Donnchadh Hartnett (born 1996) is an Irish hurler who plays for Laois Senior Championship club Rosenalis and at inter-county level with the Laois senior hurling team. He usually lines out as a left corner-back.

Honours

Mountmellick
Laois Minor Hurling Championship (1): 2014
Laois Junior B Hurling Championship (1): 2017
Laois Junior Hurling Championship (1): 2018
Laois Division 3 League (2): 2013,2017

Ballyfin Gaels
Laois Senior Hurling A Championship (1): 2017

Cork Institute Of Technology
Fresher All-Ireland (1):15/16
Laois
Joe McDonagh Cup (1): 2019

References

https://www.independent.ie/sport/gaelic-games/hurling/scintillating-kelly-lifts-banner-past-laois-38962188.html
https://www.rte.ie/sport/gaa/2020/0109/1105437-dublin-hurlers-ease-to-walsh-cup-victory-over-laois/

External links
Donnacha Hartnett profile at the Laois GAA website
Article about Hartnett at Laois Today

1996 births
Living people
CIT hurlers
Mountmellick hurlers
Laois inter-county hurlers
Hurling backs